Victoria Nneji (born 1972) is a Nigerian former Paralympian athlete. At the 2012 Women's Powerlifting 67.5kg event, she won bronze medal. She announced her retirement from competitive sports following the event, citing recurrent injuries and her advanced age as factors.

References

Paralympic athletes of Nigeria
1972 births
Living people
Medalists at the 2000 Summer Paralympics
Medalists at the 2012 Summer Paralympics
Paralympic gold medalists for Nigeria
Paralympic bronze medalists for Nigeria
Paralympic medalists in powerlifting
Powerlifters at the 2000 Summer Paralympics
Powerlifters at the 2012 Summer Paralympics
Nigerian female weightlifters
20th-century Nigerian women
21st-century Nigerian women